The S.A.B.C.A. S.XII or S.A.B.C.A S.12 was a four-passenger light transport aircraft with three engines and a high wing, built in Belgium in the early 1930s.

Design and development

This was prompted by the purchase that summer by the national airline, SABENA, of four Westland Wessex trimotors. Speed, range, and cabin minimum dimensions were specified, a first flight before October 1930 was required, and two prototypes were to be built. Alfred Renard was the only other manufacturer to respond to the call. After comparing the designs of the S.XII and the Renard R.30, the official government committee was unable to choose between the two and ordered one prototype of each. Both were high wing, braced tri-motors with more power than SABENA's Wessex.

The S.XII had a braced, high, two part wing. Each half-wing was rectangular in plan out to elliptical tips. They were wooden structures, with pairs of spruce box spars and plywood skinning. Narrow-chord ailerons filled the entire trailing edges; the inner parts could also be lowered as camber-changing flaps. On each side a pair of parallel tubular struts from the lower fuselage longeron braced the wing spars. The rear struts, the longer of the two, were aluminium inside wooden streamlined metal fairings; the forward struts, which formed part of the landing gear, were steel and metal-faired.

Two of the three Renard Type 120 , five-cylinder radial engines were mounted on frames below the wing within the bracing struts. They had long electron metal fairings behind them which contained oil tanks but their cylinder heads were exposed. The fuel tanks were contained within the wings. The third engine was in the nose of the fuselage under a metal cowling.  At the aft, the fuselage was a flat-faced, rectangular section structure based on four steel longerons and fabric covered externally. Internally, there were steel plates in the floor and ceiling and the plane had aluminium walls.

The enclosed cockpit was just ahead of the leading edge of the wing; its pilot sat on the left, though there was provision for a second seat with dual controls. The cabin could be easily reconfigured into a freight compartment and was accessed through a large port-side door.

Its tailplane was mounted on top of the fuselage ahead of the fin, braced by a long strut from the lower fuselage, assisted by two small, subsidiary struts from it upward to the tailplane. The incidence of the tailplane could be adjusted in flight; its one piece elevator was aerodynamically balanced and had a cut-out for rudder movement.  The fin was quite small but the balanced rudder was generous and extended down to the keel; overall, both horizontal and vertical surfaces were straight-edged and round-tipped.

Each wheel was mounted on its own cranked axle from the lower fuselage longeron and had a rearwards drag strut from that longeron. A short, vertical Messier oleo strut was attached to the forward wing strut which was reinforced at that joint by two short struts to the fuselage side. The mainwheels had Bendix brakes and the tailwheel was castored.

The first flight of the S.XII was made by Charles Wouters on 18 September 1931. The early trials were satisfactory and continued until the beginning of 1933, when the S.XII was sold as parts without having completed its development programme. SABENA continued to operate the Wessex until about the end of 1934.

Specifications

References

Trimotors
1930s Belgian airliners
Aircraft first flown in 1931
High-wing aircraft
SABCA aircraft